National United Renaissance (RUNA) is a political party in Peru.

History 
Originally founded as Andean Renaissance (RA) in 1992 as a political organisation, it officially registered as a party on 19 August 2002, and changed to its current name on 15 June 2013.

In 1993, Ciro Gálvez founded the Renacimiento Andino political party. He unsuccessfully ran for president in Peru's 2001 general elections, finishing sixth, and he ran as the presidential candidate of Renacimiento Andino for the general elections of Peru in 2006. On April 7, 2006, two days before the elections, he unofficially withdrew from the race, expressing his support for the candidacy of Lourdes Flores. , but he did not present a formal resignation and did not affect the vote. He received 0.186% of the votes, remaining in position 15 of the electoral contest. Subsequently, the party lost its registration the following year.

On October 28, 2020, Gálvez registered his candidacy for the 2021 general elections in Peru. He commented that "They will face the 2021 elections with their own militants, without an electoral or political alliance, or with well-known figures."

Election results

Presidential elections

See also
:Category:National United Renaissance politicians

References

1992 establishments in Peru
Democratic socialist parties in South America
Organizations established in 1992
Political parties established in 2002
Political parties in Peru
Socialist parties in Peru